Cappuccino is an Italian coffee drink

Cappuccino may also refer to:

 Cappuccino (album), a 2004 album by Mijares
 "Cappuccino" (song), a 1999 song by Rie Tomosaka produced by Ringo Sheena
 "Cappucino" (song), a song from MC Lyte's album Eyes on This
 Cappuccino (film), a 1989 Australian comedy film
 Cappucinno, a TV ident for the BBC Two Window on the World series 
 Cappuccino homolog, a protein in humans encoded by the CNO gene
 Suzuki Cappuccino, a car made by Suzuki Motor Corporation

See also
 Cappadonna, American rapper, also known as Cappachino